José Erick Correa (born July 20, 1992) is a Colombian footballer who currently plays as a forward.

Club career
Correa began his career with Colombian side Boyacá Chicó in 2010. While with the club he scored 12 goals in 33 league matches. On April 17, 2012, Correa signed a deal with Chivas USA of Major League Soccer.

Career statistics

References

External links
 

1992 births
Living people
Colombian footballers
Colombian expatriate footballers
Boyacá Chicó F.C. footballers
Chivas USA players
Club de Gimnasia y Esgrima La Plata footballers
Expatriate soccer players in the United States
Expatriate footballers in Argentina
Major League Soccer players
Association football forwards
Sportspeople from Chocó Department